John F. Lutz Furniture Co. & Funerary is a historic building complex located at St. Lawrence, Berks County, Pennsylvania. The complex consists of a combination house / shop, warehouse / showroom, and carriage house. The combination house / shop was built in 1878, and is a two-story, brick and frame building in the Italianate style.  Two small two-story, frame additions were built in 1885 and 1910.  The John F. Lutz Furniture warehouse / showroom building was built in 1900, and is a four-story building also in the Italianate style.  A four-story brick addition was built in 1928 and a two-story, concrete block addition in 1955.  The two-story, brick carriage house was built in 1896.  It is also in the Italianate style.  John F. Lutz (1863-1936) was a furniture maker, who also built coffins.  As such, he also learned to be an undertaker and operated a funerary business.  The John F. Lutz Co. remained in business until 1968, after which a furniture outlet occupied the warehouse / showroom building until 1990.

It was added to the National Register of Historic Places in 1996.

Gallery

References

Industrial buildings and structures on the National Register of Historic Places in Pennsylvania
Italianate architecture in Pennsylvania
Houses completed in 1878
Buildings and structures in Berks County, Pennsylvania
National Register of Historic Places in Berks County, Pennsylvania
1878 establishments in Pennsylvania